Jonckheere may refer to:
Jonckheere, Belgian motor coach and bus builder
Aimable Robert Jonckheere (1920–2005), French statistician and psychologist 
Robert Jonckhèere (1888–1974), French astronomer

See also 
Jonkheer